KFAZ may refer to:

KFAZ (defunct), American TV station operated 1953 - 1954, channel 43, licensed to Monroe, Louisiana; affiliated with DuMont and ABC
KFAZ-CA, American TV station founded 1999, licensed to Visalia, California; rebroadcasts on channel 8, affiliated with Azteca America